Boyhood is a 2014 American coming-of-age drama film written and directed by Richard Linklater and starring Patricia Arquette, Ellar Coltrane, Lorelei Linklater and Ethan Hawke.

Awards and accolades

References

External links
 

Lists of accolades by film